The Quebec Kebs were a professional basketball team located in Laval, Quebec, formerly based in Quebec City, Quebec. The Kebs were part of the National Basketball League of Canada.  They also played in the Atlantic Division of the Premier Basketball League. Prior to May 2008, they played in the American Basketball Association. Kebs is short for Kebekwa, a phonetic spelling of the word Québécois, or "Quebecers." Prior to folding, the team was briefly renamed the Laval Kebs.

History

2006–07 season
The team held a survey to name the team and 66% of the people preferred the name Kebekwa (a phonetic spelling of the word Québécois, "Quebecers").

The team earned a trip to the playoffs in their inaugural season and were defeated by the Strong Island Sound 108–97 in the first round.

2007–08 season
Going with a fresh new image, the team changed its logo and color scheme. The team won its season opener 108–106 against the Manchester Millrats on October 12, 2007, at the Pavillon de la jeunesse. While the team finished with a 15–19 record, the Pavillon was the location of the 2008 ABA Championship Series, so the team gained an automatic Final VIII berth. Home-court advantage could not save them from first-round defeat, as the Kebs lost in the quarterfinals to the Texas Tycoons by a score of 122–120.

After the ABA playoffs, the team chose to join the PBL, announcing they would simply be the Quebec Kebs.

2009–10 season
The Kebs changed their home arena from the Pavillon de la Jeunesse in Quebec City to PEPS at L'Université Laval in Sainte-Foy, Quebec.

2010–11 season
Due to controversial officiating in the PBL playoffs, the Kebs, together with the Saint John Mill Rats and the Halifax Rainmen, left the PBL in April 2011.

2011–12 season
On 12 May 2011, the Kebs were one of three teams announced as founding members of the National Basketball League of Canada.

The Kebs were one of seven teams competing in NBL Canada's inaugural season, joining past PBL rivals the Halifax Rainmen and Saint John Mill Rats along with new teams the London Lightning, Moncton Miracles, Oshawa Power, and Summerside Storm.

2012
Initially the team announced it would change arenas to Colisée de Laval and was rebranded as the Laval Kebs, however, the team folded before the start of the 2012–13 NBL Canada season when the ownership of the team was transferred to the league. The team was replaced in the NBL Canada by the Montreal Jazz.

Final roster

Injured reserve

Season-by-season record

See also
Canada Basketball

References

External links
 Official website of the Quebec Kebs
 Frozen Hoops ABA - Frozen Hoops ABA. Covering the Canadian teams.

 
Former Premier Basketball League teams
Sport in Laval, Quebec
Basketball teams established in 2006
Basketball teams disestablished in 2012
Defunct National Basketball League of Canada teams
Basketball teams in Quebec
2006 establishments in Quebec
2012 disestablishments in Quebec